Claire Wright (b. 2 February 1994) is a Canadian water polo player. She plays for the Canadian national women's water polo team, and also played collegiately at Loyola Marymount University.

Career highlights

Youth competitor

Senior competitor

2020 Tokyo Summer Olympics 
One of 371 Canadian athletes competing, Wright made her Olympic debut at the 2020 Summer Olympics in Tokyo, where Team Canada finished in 7th place.

Personal life 
Wright started playing water polo at age 16. She graduated from Loyola Marymount University in 2018 with a degree in Health and Human Sciences. 

Her younger sister Emma also plays for Team Canada. Her uncle Jeff Beukeboom played in the NHL for the New York Rangers and Edmonton Oilers.

References 

Olympic water polo players of Canada
Canadian female water polo players
1994 births
Sportspeople from Ontario
Living people
Water polo players at the 2020 Summer Olympics